David Stefan Rovics (born April 10, 1967) is an American indie singer/songwriter. His music concerns topical subjects such as the 2003 Iraq war, anti-globalization, anarchism, and social justice issues.  Rovics has been an outspoken critic of former President George W. Bush, the Republican Party, John Kerry, and the Democratic Party.

Rovics is critical of the United States government's policies and claims that the "U.S. government's foreign policy represents U.S. corporate interests" and that "the U.S. government does not like democracy either at home or abroad."

Although some of Rovics' work is not self-published, and much of it is commercially distributed, Rovics has made all of his recorded music freely available as downloadable mp3 files. He encourages the free distribution of his work by all non-profit means to promote his work and spread political messages, and speaks out against websites or programs like iTunes that charge money for downloading his songs. Rovics has also advocated the performing of his songs at protests and demonstrations and has made his sheet music and lyrics available for download.

Biography
David Rovics was born in New York City. His family moved to Wilton, Connecticut when he was young. Rovics was politically inspired during his adolescence by his experiences with the conservative-oriented, Christian milieu of his home town. His parents, both classical musicians and educators, were liberal in their outlook. Perhaps for this reason, while in his teens Rovics acquired interests in nuclear disarmament, vegetarianism and other counterculture issues. He has described himself as an "anti-Zionist Jew from New York".

In 1985, Rovics enrolled at Earlham College in Richmond, Indiana, but dropped out and moved to Berkeley, California. He worked in occupations such as a cook, barista, secretary and typist, while pursuing his musical interests as a street and subway performer and in small clubs and bars. He immersed himself in leftist counterculture and made contact with other songwriters and performers on the underground circuit. By the early 1990s he was a full-time busker in the Boston subways.

From the mid-1990s, Rovics has spent most of his time on concert tours around the world. Rovics tours regularly on four continents, playing for audiences large and small at cafes, pubs, universities, churches, union halls and protest rallies. He has had his music featured on Democracy Now!, the BBC, Al-Jazeera, Acik Radyo and other networks. His essays are published regularly on CounterPunch and Truthout and the 200+ songs he makes available on the web have been downloaded more than a million times. Although Rovics' work has not gained major commercial success, it has been acclaimed in sections of the press.

He currently lives in Portland, Oregon, with his family and has a daughter, Leila, who was born in 2006.

Political activism

Rovics has also written a song on Francis Hughes, a Provisional IRA combatant who died in the 1981 Irish Hunger Strike, in his song "Up The Provos".

Rovics has been accused of antisemitism and Holocaust denial due to having interviewed Matthew Heimbach Gilad Atzmon, including promoting Atzmon's book The Wandering Who. He strongly denies these accusations.

Discography

 Make It So (Self-release, 1996)
 Pay Day at Coal Creek (Self-release, 1998)
 We Just Want the World (Liberation Records, 1999)
 Live at Club Passim (Liberation Records, 2000)
 Living In These Times (Liberation Records, 2001)
 Hang a Flag In the Window (Liberation Records, 2002)
 Who Would Jesus Bomb? (Self-release, 2003)
 Behind the Barricades, the Best of David Rovics (AK Press/Daemon Records 2003)
 The Return (Ever Reviled Records, 2003)
 Songs for Mahmud (Ever Reviled Records, 2004)
 Beyond the Mall (Self-release, 2004)
 For the Moment (Yoyo Records, 2005)
 Halliburton Boardroom Massacre (MI5 Records/Caroline Distribution, 2006)
 The Commons (Irregular Records, 2007) Recorded live at Club Passim
 Ten Thousand Miles Away (Liberation Records, 2009)
 Waiting for the Fall - A Retrospective (Liberation Records, 2009)
 Troubador: People's History in Song (Liberation Records, 2010)
 Big Red Sessions (Liberation Records, 2011)
 Ten New Songs (2011) (Liberation Records, 2011)
 Meanwhile In Afghanistan (Liberation Records, 2012)
 99% (Liberation Records, 2012)
 Spies Are Reading My Blog (Liberation Records, 2013)
 A Coup That Wasn't A Coup (17 Aug 2013)
 Everything Can Change (Liberation Records, 2013)
 Into A Prism (Liberation Records, 2013)
 Falasteen Habibti (Self-release, 2014)
 All the News That's Fit to Sing (Self-release, 2014)
 When I'm Elected President / Wayfaring Stranger (Self-release, 2014)
 The Other Side (Self-release, 2015)
 1936 (Self-Release, 2016)
Letter to My Landlord (Self-Release, 2016)
Spies are Reading My Blog (Self-Release, 2017)
Punk Baroque (Self-Release, 2017)
Ballad of a Wobbly (Self-Release, 2018)
Historic Times (Self-Release, 2019)
Meanwhile in Afghanistan (Self-Release, 2019)
Songs for Today (Self-Release, 2019)
Strangers and Friends (Self-Release, 2019)
Notes From a Failed State (Self-Release, 2020)
Say Their Names (Self-Release, 2020)
Rebel Songs (Free The Imagination) (Self-Release, 2020)
It's Been a Year (Self-Release, 2021)
May Day (Self-Release, 2021)

Children's albums
 Har Har Har! Pirate Songs for Kids (CD Baby.Com/Indys, 2008)
 Ballad of a Dung Beetle (2011)

References

Further reading
 The Spectator: Musician David Rovics uses music as a way of protesting social problems
 Democracy Now: David Rovics Pays Tribute to Fellow Musician and Friend Brad Will
 Vive le Canada: Political folk musician David Rovics brings “songs of social significance” to Halifax

External links
Official website
Official Youtube Page
Interview for the Revolutionary Students Union (Italy)

1967 births
Living people
American anti-war activists
American folk singers
20th-century American Jews
American male bloggers
American bloggers
American male singer-songwriters
Daemon Records artists
Earlham College alumni
Industrial Workers of the World members
Jewish singers
Anti-Zionist Jews
Political music artists
Singers from New York City
21st-century American Jews
Singer-songwriters from New York (state)
American anarchists